The Sarposa Prison tunneling escape was the escape of around 475 prisoners from Sarposa Prison in Kandahar by tunnel in April 2011. The tunnel was dug from the outside. It was reported that at least 71 of the escapees were recaptured within days.

Escape

The tunnel used for the escape reportedly took several months to build, was over a hundred meters long, and used sophisticated techniques involving electricity, ventilation, and potentially the assistance of engineers. The tunnel ended in a house outside the prison that had been searched by security forces just two and a half months prior, yet with no suspicious activity reported. However, reports have speculated about whether it would have been possible to conduct the substantial earth-removal required for the construction of the tunnel without security forces having been aware.

Outcome

In the end, around 475 of the prisoners at the central jail managed to escape. At least 71 of the escaped prisoners were reportedly recaptured.

Reports and commentary following the outbreak have focused on the extent that prison officials may have been complicit in the escape, and on whether the escaped prisoners can be expected to join in larger-scale attacks.  Political assassinations in the Kandahar area are reportedly down in the last year, but suspicions about government officials, and their inability to protect civilians, has remained high. In response to the escape, the Afghan Uniformed Police established a checkpoint directly across the highway from the prison, directly above the tunnel exit. The security around the prison was also greatly enhanced by coalition and Afghan forces.

Investigation

The head of the team investigating the escape, Mohammed Tahir, further cemented the likelihood that there was complicity from a number of people. He described the tunnel as so carefully planned and sophisticated that it appeared that engineers must have been involved, not merely men with shovels. "The tunnel was dug in a very professional way," said Tahir. "They have used an electrical system and a ventilation system and small shovels and pickaxes for digging and wheelbarrows for removing the soil."

See also
 Sarposa Prison attack of 2008
 Ghazni prison escape

References

External links
Reuters report
 The Taliban's version: 

Escapes
2011 in Afghanistan
Taliban activities
History of Kandahar
Tunnels in Afghanistan
April 2011 events in Afghanistan